Blisworth Rectory Farm Quarry is a  geological Site of Special Scientific Interest west of Blisworth in Northamptonshire. It is a Geological Conservation Review site.

This site exposes White Limestone dating to the Middle Jurassic Bathonian stage, around 165 million years ago. Common fossils are brachiopods, corals and gastropods, and there are also nautiloids and vertebrate teeth.

The site is on private land with no public access.

References

Sites of Special Scientific Interest in Northamptonshire
Geological Conservation Review sites